Rob Young is a Canadian sound engineer. He was nominated for an Academy Award in the category Best Sound for the film Unforgiven. He has worked on more than 100 films since 1975.

Selected filmography
 Unforgiven (1992)

References

External links

Year of birth missing (living people)
Living people
Canadian audio engineers
People from Kings County, New Brunswick